In late 19th century Russia, a zemlyachestvo was a society of men living away from their home regions. Found among students, traveling traders and migrant workers, the zemlyachestvo united those with a common geographical origin when they were far from home.

Zemlyachestvo is defined by Tavadov G.T. in his book Ethnology as 1) a sense of unity among people sharing a homeland they were born in; 2) an association of natives of one locality, region, territory, country; 3) other various forms of association of citizens according to the territorial principle: soldiers and officers serving in one unit, students studying in the same university, etc. 

The pre 1860s reform time period can be considered the beginning of community associations in Russia.

The noted Russian revolutionary Vladimir Lenin joined the zemlyachestvo for his home region, Simbirsk, when he was studying at the University of Kazan.

See also 
 Nation (university) - a similar organization for non-locals studying in medieval universities in Western Europe

References

Bibliography

 
 
 

Russian culture
19th century in the Russian Empire
Society of the Russian Empire
Russian diaspora